Elton is a village and civil parish in the borough of Stockton-on-Tees and ceremonial county of County Durham, England. It is situated a short distance to the west of Stockton-on-Tees.

St. John's Church is located in Elton. It is a Grade II listed building, and was built around 900 years ago.

A public house called The Sutton Arms has been in Elton for 122 years, but closed in 2021 following the retirement of its owners. It is currently under new ownership but there is no news on a potential time for its reopening.

Population
The population of Elton as shown in the 2011 Census was 324.

References

External links

http://www.visionofbritain.org.uk/place/place_page.jsp?p_id=4195

Villages in County Durham
Borough of Stockton-on-Tees
Places in the Tees Valley